Live in Israel may refer to:

Live in Israel, video album Noa (singer) and The Solis String Quartet 
Live In Israel, jazz CD album by Roberto Ottaviano 2002
Live in Israel, video album by Avraham Fried 2009
Live in Israel (Matisyahu video album), packaged with No Place to Be